Matthew "Recloose" Chicoine is an American electronic music producer, DJ and musician hailing from Detroit, Michigan, US. He is known for numerous releases on independent dance labels like Planet E, Rush Hour, Peacefrog, Studio !K7, Sonar Kollektiv and Delusions of Grandeur.  Chicoine is also a touring DJ who has played in and around Europe, the UK, the United States, Japan, China, Singapore, Indonesia, Brazil, Australia and New Zealand.

Life and career
His professional career began in 1997 when he met techno artist Carl Craig via a demo tape slipped into a sandwich while working at Detroit's Russell Street Deli.  He released his debut EP So This Is The Dining Room EP in 1998 and follow up Spelunking EP in 1999 on Planet E recordings, which were both re-issued via Rush Hour Recordings in 2010. His debut album Cardiology on Planet E/Studio !k7 came out in 2002, a critically acclaimed release that featured Detroit area artists Dwele, Genevieve Marentette, Colin Stetson, Rayse Biggs of Was (Not Was), Jeremy Ellis, Paul Randolph, Jerry The Cat, Amp Fiddler, John Arnold and Malik Alston.

In late 2001 he re-located to New Zealand where he began working with local musicians Dallas Tamaira of Fat Freddy's Drop, Hollie Smith, Jonathan Crayford, and members of Trinity Roots, also forming the touring group "The Recloose Live Band," a group that performed at the North Sea Jazz Festival, and London's renowned clubs Fabric and The Jazz Cafe.  He was awarded the Best Dance/Electronica Album Tui for his album Perfect Timing LP at the New Zealand Music Awards in late 2008.

In 2008 he founded the Hit It & Quit It radio show on Auckland, New Zealand's George FM, co-hosted with local producer and DJ Frank Booker, releasing a radio-themed compilation CD "Hit It & Quit It Radio Revue Vol. I" with accompanying Serato vinyl pressing in 2011.  In 2009 he undertook full-time work as programme leader and tutor at Auckland's Music and Audio Institute of New Zealand, helping to create and implement the DJ and Electronic Music Production program.

Discography
Studio albums
 Cardiology (2002)
 Hiatus on the Horizon (2004)
 Perfect Timing (2008)

Compilation albums
 Early Works (2010)

Live albums
 Backwards and Sideways (2007)

EPs
 So This Is the Dining Room (1998)
 Spelunking (1999)
 Deeper Waters (2008)
 Saturday Night Manifesto E.P. (2011)
 Magic (2012)
 Don't Get Me Wrong EP (2012)
 It's Too Late EP (2013)

Singles
 "Can't Take It" (2000)
 "Ain't Changin'" (2002)
 "Us vs. Us" (2003)
 "Dust" (2005)
 "Mana's Bounce" b/w "Time Is on Your Side" (2005)
 "Maui's Lament" (2008)

References

External links
 

Living people
Year of birth missing (living people)
Musicians from Detroit
Peacefrog Records artists